The 1938 All-Ireland Junior Hurling Championship was the 21st staging of the All-Ireland Junior Championship since its establishment by the Gaelic Athletic Association in 1912.

Dublin entered the championship as the defending champions, however, they were beaten in the Leinster Championship.

The All-Ireland final was played on 30 October 1938 at New Eltham, between London and Cork, in what was their first ever meeting in a final. London won the match by 4-04 to 4-01 to claim their first ever championship title.

Results

All-Ireland Junior Hurling Championship

All-Ireland semi-finals

All-Ireland home final

All-Ireland final

References

Junior
All-Ireland Junior Hurling Championship